The Masonic Building in Kerrville, Texas is an Italianate building built in 1890. Alfred Giles was the architect. Kerrville Masonic Lodge #697 made its home in the building until 1927. The first floor later housed a post office and grocery store. The building was listed on the National Register of Historic Places in 1984. It was restored during 1984-1985 using rare woods and including work by special craftsmen.

See also

National Register of Historic Places listings in Kerr County, Texas
Recorded Texas Historic Landmarks in Kerr County

References

External links

Italianate architecture in Texas
Masonic buildings completed in 1890
Buildings and structures in Kerr County, Texas
Former Masonic buildings in Texas
Clubhouses on the National Register of Historic Places in Texas
National Register of Historic Places in Kerr County, Texas
Recorded Texas Historic Landmarks